Capablanca chess (or Capablanca's chess) is a chess variant invented in the 1920s by World Chess Champion José Raúl Capablanca. It incorporates two new pieces and is played on a 10×8 board.  Capablanca believed that chess would be played out in a few decades (meaning games between grandmasters would always end in draws). This threat of "draw death" for chess was his main motivation for creating a more complex version of the game.

  The archbishop combines powers of a bishop and a knight.
  The chancellor combines powers of a rook and a knight.

The new pieces allow new strategies and possibilities that change the game.  For example, the archbishop by itself can checkmate a lone king in the corner (when placed diagonally with one square in between).

Setup and rules

Capablanca proposed two opening setups for Capablanca chess. The king moves three squares when castling instead of moving two squares as in standard chess. A pawn can promote to archbishop or chancellor in addition to the regular promotion options in standard chess.
Unlike orthodox chess, each king, instead of each queen, starts on a square of its own color (the white king on a light square; the black king on a dark square).

Capablanca also experimented with a 10×10 board size with a different initial setup and where pawns could advance up to three squares on their first move. Edward Lasker wrote: ... I played many test games with Capablanca, and they rarely lasted more than twenty or twenty-five moves. We tried boards of 10×10 squares and 10×8 squares, and we concluded that the latter was preferable because hand-to-hand fights start earlier on it.

Lasker was one of the few supporters. Hungarian grandmaster Géza Maróczy also played some games with Capablanca (who got the better of him). British champion William Winter thought that there were too many strong pieces, making the  less relevant.

The new piece names archbishop (originally named chancellor) and chancellor (originally named marshall, followed by marshal) were introduced by Capablanca himself. These names are still used in most modern variants of Capablanca Chess.

Variants of Capablanca chess

Predating Capablanca chess

Capablanca was not the first person to add the archbishop and the chancellor to the normal chess set, though he is the most famous. Other attempts mostly differ only by the arrangement of pieces and the castling rules.

In 1617, Pietro Carrera published a book Il Gioco degli Scacchi, which contained a description of a chess variant played on an 8×10 board. He placed new pieces between a rook and a knight. It is highly probable that his primary motivation for the design was the limitations of opening theory in this time and he was not as concerned with avoiding structural weaknesses in the new game’s starting position created by a potential new piece standing on a given file, as with the Archbishop between the knight and the rook leaving its own pawn unprotected. Carrera used the names Centauro (centaur) instead of archbishop, and Campione (champion) instead of chancellor.

In 1874, Henry Bird proposed a chess variant similar to Carrera's variant. The only significant difference was the opening setup. The new pieces were now between the bishops and the royal pair, the archbishop close to the king, the chancellor close to the queen. The queen's bishop's pawn is not protected in the initial setup. Bird used the names equerry instead of archbishop, and guard instead of chancellor. The theoretical benefit of this setup is that the new pieces’ pawns are thus very important to the opening theory of the game, equally to the king’s and queen's pawns. This makes the chancellor‘s pawn a pair for the queen's pawn as leading to a more strategically oriented game from the nature of the chancellor.

Postdating Capablanca chess

Capablanca chess has inspired a number of variants:
 Universal chess (1928) by Dr. Bruno Violet (on 10×10 board). He proposed two arrangements.
 Grand Chess (1984) by Christian Freeling
 Gothic chess (2000) by Edward A. Trice
 Aberg's variation (2003) by Hans Aberg
 Capablanca random chess (2004) by Reinhard Scharnagl
 Grotesque chess (2004) by Fergus Duniho
 Paulovich's variation (2004) by David Paulovich
 Ladorean chess (2005) by Bernhard U. Hermes
 Embassy chess (2005) by Kevin Hill
 Univers chess (2006) by Fergus Duniho
 Schoolbook chess (2006) by Sam Trenholme
 Victorian chess (2007) by John K. Lewis
 Modern Capablanca random chess (2008) by José Carrillo

Several chess variants postdating Capablanca chess were designed with initial arrangements where all pawns are protected by at least one piece; these include Universal chess, Grand chess, Gothic chess, Grotesque chess, Ladorean chess, Schoolbook chess, and Univers chess which adopted the starting lineup of Universal chess and used it on a 10×8 board, and Embassy chess which uses a starting position identical to Grand Chess adapted to a 10×8 board.

Aberg's variation has the same setup as the historic ancestor Carrera's chess. Aberg followed Murray's description, which was wrong, and invented a new game by switching the archbishop and the chancellor, thus reaching exactly the setup proposed by the 17th century Italian master.

In 2004, David Paulowich proposed an arrangement that was included in ChessV as Capablanca Chess, Paulowich Variant. John Kipling Lewis re-invented it independently in 2007, giving it the name of Victorian Chess.

Capablanca random chess applies the concept of Fischer random chess to Capablanca chess, except with additional restrictions for the starting setup:
 All pawns in the starting positions must be protected by at least one piece.
 Bishops cannot start on neighboring squares.
 The queen and the archbishop must start at opposite-colored squares.
 The starting position cannot be that of Gothic chess.

In total, there are 12,118 starting positions in Capablanca random chess.

Using a different board
Some variants of Capablanca Chess do not use the standard 10×8 board. For example, grand chess, a popular variant invented by Dutch game designer Christian Freeling in 1984, uses Capablanca chess pieces on a 10×10 board. The layout allows the rooks early mobility.

Seirawan chess 
Seirawan chess is a Capablanca chess variant by Yasser Seirawan and Bruce Harper that uses a standard 8x8 chess board.  The initial position is that of standard chess. Each side has additionally two pieces in hand (called a hawk and an elephant in Seirawan Chess):
  The elephant, moves as a rook or a knight; (this piece is better known as Chancellor or Empress) and
  The hawk, moves as a bishop or a knight. (this piece is better known as Archbishop or Princess).

The elephant and the hawk are introduced to the game in the following way: whenever the player moves a piece (king, queen, knight, bishop or rook) from its starting position (that hasn't already been moved), one of the pieces in hand may be placed immediately on the square just vacated. One cannot use the placing of an elephant or hawk to block check. If the player moves all his pieces from the first rank without placing one or both in hand pieces, he forfeits the right to do so. After castling, the player may put one of the pieces in hand on either the king's or the rook's square, but he may not place both pieces in hand in the same turn. Pawns may promote to a hawk or an elephant in this game (in addition to the normal chess pieces).

When notating games in algebraic notation, the letter E is used for the Elephant and H for the Hawk. If the player places one of the two pieces on the board, it is written after a slash. For example, 1. Nc3/E means that the player moved his knight from b1 to c3 and placed the elephant on b1.

Strategy
H. G. Muller suggested the following estimated piece values:

Programs that play Capablanca chess
 ChessV 
 Fairy-Max
 Fairy Stockfish
 Chess Remix

References

Bibliography

Further reading
 (extensive history)

External links
"Capablanca's chess" by Hans Bodlaender, The Chess Variant Pages

Capablanca Chess a simple program by Ed Friedlander (Java)
PyChess Website online play (real time with digital clocks)

Board games introduced in the 1920s
Chess variants